Brush Creek is an unincorporated community in Smith County, Tennessee, United States. The zipcode is: 38547.

Notes

Unincorporated communities in Smith County, Tennessee
Unincorporated communities in Tennessee